Sir Edward Dering, 3rd Baronet (18 April 1650 – 15 October 1689) was an English Member of Parliament and baronet.

He was the eldest son of Sir Edward Dering, 2nd Baronet of Surrenden Dering House in Pluckley, Kent and his wife Mary Harvey, a composer and niece of Dr. William Harvey. He succeeded his father in 1684.

Like his father and grandfather before him, Dering served as an MP for the County of Kent; he sat in the last three parliaments of Charles II, between 1678/9 and 1681 (the Oxford Parliament). His father was still living, and MP for Hythe at the time, so the son was returned as Edward Dering Esq.

Defeated in the 1689 election as the parliamentary candidate for Hythe, he instead raised a regiment of foot (later to become the 24th Regiment of Foot) and took it to Ireland to support King William III. There he fell ill and died at the age of 39. His body was brought home and buried in Pluckley.

He had married Elizabeth, daughter of Sir William Cholmeley, 2nd Baronet of Whitby, by his second wife Elizabeth, daughter of John Savile of Methley, both in Yorkshire; she was coheiress to her brother Sir Hugh Cholmeley, 3rd Baronet, who had died as a child. The given name Cholmeley was often used in the Dering family from this point, the first being their son Sir Cholmeley Dering, 4th Baronet. Lady Dering died on 20 October 1704 and was also buried at Pluckley.

References

1650 births
1689 deaths
People from Pluckley
Baronets in the Baronetage of England
English MPs 1679
English MPs 1680–1681
English MPs 1681